Artie Gold (15 January 1947 – 14 February 2007) was a Montreal-based Canadian poet who rose to prominence in the 1970s as a member of the circle of Montreal-based writers known as The Vehicule Poets. Characterized as one of the wildest and most daring of the Vehicule poets, Gold was influenced by the work of Jack Spicer and Frank O'Hara, his cats (to whom he was allergic) and his myriad eclectic autodidact interests. Though plagued by illness throughout his life, he worked prolifically and was always less interested in fame or academic placement than he was in creating poetry "at the front of the arts". In a tribute to Gold, the Montreal Gazette considered him "one of Canada's finest poets".

Bibliography 

cityflowers, Delta Press, Montreal, 1974
Even Yr Photograph Looks Afraid of Me, Talon Books, Vancouver, 1975
Mixed Doubles, with Geoff Young, The Figures, Berkeley, 1975
5 Jockey Poems, The Word Book Store, Montreal, 1977
Some of the Cat Poems, CrossCountry Press, Montreal, 1978
before Romantic Words, Vehicule Press, Montreal, 1979
The Beautiful Chemical Waltz, Selected Poems, The Muses' Company, Montreal, 1992
Hotel Victoria, Above Ground Press, Ottawa, 2003
The Collected Books of Artie Gold, Talon Books, Vancouver, 2010

References

External links 
 Artie Gold at the Literary Underground wiki
 "Remembering Artie Gold" by Stephen Morrissey
 Vehicule Press Tribute
 Montreal Gazette Tribute
 Globe and Mail feature on Gold by Wanda O'Connor

20th-century Canadian poets
20th-century Canadian male writers
Canadian male poets
21st-century Canadian poets
Writers from Montreal
2007 deaths
Anglophone Quebec people
1947 births
Jewish Canadian writers
21st-century Canadian male writers